Arab Canadian identity is the objective or subjective state of perceiving oneself as an Arab Canadian and as relating to being Arab Canadian. The expression of the identity has been widely analyzed and observed by academics as a culturally challenging self-identification in the context of elements of Western culture in the 21st-century.

Background

Raja G. Khouri, who has served as President of the Canadian Arab Federation, in 2003 described the interconnected perceptions of a Canadian national identity and Arab identity. In 2009, University of Alberta professor Wisam Kh. Abdul-Jabbar described the  "double consciousness" of Arab Canadians, variously struggling with their Arab Canadian identity versus a sense of "being Canadian". Abdul-Jabbar has proposed that citizens or residents of Arab descent have come to consider a cautious dual-identity approach as essential to social integration in the country.

Presented at the 2009 annual American Sociological Association meeting, research from Madona Mokbel detailed the "Dichotomous Perceptions of the Arab Canadian Identity in Canada", particularly since the 2001 9/11 attacks. Shortly after the attacks, Canadian Museum of Civilization postponed an exhibit, The Lands within Me, displaying the diasporic-based works of thirty Arab-Canadian artists. Moral outrage at the short notice of the postponement, suspicion of its connection to the attacks and subsequent protest at the decision, has been described as an early centralizing medium for Arab Canadian identity.

Dr Christina Civantos of Miami University, writing in Food for Our Grandmothers, has detailed the broad and sometimes conflicting elements that constitute the Arab world and which, therefore, do not always simply amalgamate into a coherent Arab Canadian identity. The collection of writing by Arab-American and Arab-Canadian feminists, in analysis by Amaney Jamal, has been described as shifting the definition of Arab Canadian identity onwards from "essentializing categories" while still explicitly confronting the racial and cultural realities of Arabs in North America.

In 2013, academic Paul Eid, a researcher at Commission des droits de la personne et des droits de la jeunesse, has remarked that Canadians of a Coptic Egyptian background are the most likely to explicitly embrace an Arab-Canadian self-identification, due to the fact Copts were some of the earliest Arabic immigrants to Canada since the 1960s.

Academic studies
A survey conducted in Edmonton, Alberta in the pre-2000, showed females 3 in 10, and 1 in 10 males, "tried to hide their Arab-Canadian identity". The research also significantly contrasted along lines of faith, with 44 percent of Arab Christians and 13 percent Arab Muslims also suppressing the identity.

Research by academics Caitlin McDonald and Barbara Sellers-Young has also suggested that anti-Arabism and prejudice in North America can create a hostile environment for the expression of Arab Canadian identity.

See also

References

Arab culture
 
Arab diaspora
Arab diaspora in North America
Society of the Arab world
Collective identity
Identity politics
Canadian identity